Raúl Sola (born 1898, date of death unknown) was an Argentine fencer. He competed in the individual and team sabre competitions at the 1924 Summer Olympics.

References

External links
 

1898 births
Year of death missing
Argentine male fencers
Argentine sabre fencers
Olympic fencers of Argentina
Fencers at the 1924 Summer Olympics